The Aff is a river in Brittany, western France.

See also
List of canals in France

References

Rivers of France
Rivers of Brittany
Rivers of Morbihan